This article lists all rugby league footballers who have played first-grade NRL games for the Melbourne Storm.

NOTES:
 Debut: Players are listed in order of player cap number as shown on Melbourne Storm honour board. 
 Appearances: NRL games for Melbourne Storm only. This not a total of their career games and does not include World Club Challenge games. E.g. Marcus Bai has played a career total of 254 first grade games but of those 144 were at Melbourne.
 Previous Club: refers to the previous first-grade rugby league club (NRL or Super League) the player played at and does not refer to any junior club, Rugby Union club or a RL club he was signed to but never played at.

List of players
The statistics in this table are current as at round 3 of the 2023 NRL season.

NRL Nines players 

Melbourne have fielded teams in each edition of the NRL Nines held in 2014–2017 and 2020.

Notes:

 Players are listed in debut order, with the first 17 correlating in jersey number worn in debut game in the 2014 Auckland Nines tournament.
 Player numbers in this list are unofficial.
 † indicates captain during tournament.

NRL Under-20s players 
The NRL Under-20s competition, known commercially as the Toyota Cup (2008-2012) and Holden Cup (2013-2017) was contested by the Melbourne Storm. Colloquially, the team was known as the Thunderbolts, a name which has carried through to the  joint-venture Storm/VRL junior representative team, the Victoria Thunderbolts who compete in NSWRL competitions (and previously QRL competitions).  The team was based in Melbourne (2008-2015), before playing out of the Sunshine Coast for the 2016-17 seasons, playing home games at Sunshine Coast Stadium, Suzuki Stadium with occasional games in Melbourne.

Notes:

 Players are listed in debut order, with the first 17 correlating in jersey number worn in debut game in Round 1, 2008.
 Player numbers in this list are unofficial.
 Statistics in this season are current as at the end of the 2017 season and the disbanding of the competition (source).
 Players highlighted in  also played in the NRL for Melbourne.

Notes

References

External links
Rugby League Tables / Melbourne Point Scorers
RLP List of Players
RLP Melbourne Storm Transfers & Debuts
18thman.com - Melbourne Storm NRL Under-20s Players

 
Players
Lists of Australian rugby league players
Melbourne sport-related lists
National Rugby League lists